Hamidou ben Ali , known as Raïs Hamidou, or Amidon in American literature, born around 1770 in Algiers, and died on June 17, 1815, near Cape Gata off the coast of southern Spain, was an Algerian corsair. He captured up to 200 ships during his career. Hamidou ensured the prosperity of the Deylik of Algiers, and gave it its last glory before the French invasion. His biography is relatively well known because the French archivist Albert Devoulx has found important documents, including a precious register of prizes opened by the authorities of the Deylik in 1765. Songs and legends have also taken hold of this charismatic character.

Origins 
He was the son of a man named Ali. According to some sources his father was an artisan tailor in Algiers.

According to documents discovered by the archivist Albert Devoulx, Hamidou "belonged to a class of Arabs settled in the cities for a more or less long time, which the Europeans called Moors". Despite this, after the battle off Cape Gata, his captured officers and crew said that he was Kabyle during an interview with their American captors. He is also described as a “native Algerian” by European sources.

At age 10 he started working aboard a pirate ship commanded by Raïs Memmou as a cabin boy. There he learned many different things, and he gained much experience from it.

Career as Rais 
There are no documents on the activity of Raïs Hamidou during the first years of his functions as a pirate captain in Algiers, but we can assume that he was under the tutelage of an older privateer, and that he was doing his apprenticeship. After passing the exam set by the Taifa of the Raïs (a council of the pirate captains of Algiers), he was allowed to become a raïs himself. His first success came shortly after his appointment, when he successfully guided his ship from seemingly certain defeat at the hands of a much larger Spanish foe.

After Oran was recaptured in 1792, the then Bey of Oran, Mohammed el-Kebir appointed Hamidou as the chief of the Oranese navy, which was used both as a privateer fleet, and a defence one. During that time the navy around Oran consisted of three Xebecs, and several Feluccas. The Dey Sidi Hassan also granted him another three-masted Xebec.

In 1795 or 1796 after returning from a raid in Italy he got into a storm and decided to anchor at La Calle, a French outpost in nominally Algerian territory. His anchors broke and his ship, carried by a storm, was smashed against the rocks of the shore. This event nearly ruined Hamidou's career. The loss of a ship entrusted to a raïs was most often very severely punished. He decided not to make his report, and he was caught and brought back by force to Algiers. But he was able to calm the anger of the Dey and soon, he had a frigate built by the Spanish Maestro Antonio, a renegade carpenter in Algiers.

In 1797 a corvette of the Dey of Algiers returned to the port without displaying the Algerian flag or saluting the mosque of Sidi Abderrahman, patron of the city of Algiers. This symbolic act meant the loss of its captain either in battle, or desertion. In fact, the latter, having many misdeeds and serious navigation errors to be forgiven, had preferred to desert, and went to take refuge in Morocco. The Dey, wishing to reward Hamidou for his recent successes, appointed him to the command of the vessel. Hamidou is mentioned regularly in the register of catches, especially involving Genoese, Venetian, Neapolitan and Greek vessels.

On March 8, 1802, after a few days of cruising, Hamidou commanding a Xebec of 40 guns met a Portuguese warship of 44 guns. Aware of the military superiority of the Portuguese frigate, he employed cunning. He hoisted an English flag to approach the Portuguese. The Portuguese let themselves be approached by the Algerians, as they realize far too late that they are facing pirates. The Algerians boarded and devastated the ship. 282 Portuguese were taken prisoner. The corsairs captured the ship.

The frigate would become a unit of the Algerian fleet under the name of La Portugaise. Hamidou was given an honorary Yatagan, and was received in solemn audience. The Portuguese frigate was not the only one that the Algerians or Hamidou captured. On 28 May the same year, Hamidou captured another Portuguese war frigate of 36 guns. These successes earned the Rais the title of the admiral of the Algerian fleet, and his own villa in El Biar from Hussein Khodja who would later become Dey.

For nearly two years, Hamidou's name ceased to appear on the prize register because of internal problems and rivalry with the Odjak, and the jealousy of the new Dey. In 1808, one of the first acts of the new Dey,  Ali III ar-Rasul was exiling Hamidou whose popularity he saw as a threat. Hamidou was sent into exile in Beirut but Hadj Ali Dey who came to power in 1809, reinvited him into the country and reappointed him into all of his previous positions.

Back in Algiers, he received the command of a division of four ships, a 44-gun frigate commanded by himself, a 44-gun frigate commanded by the Raïs Ali Gharnaout, La Portugaise, the aforementioned 44-gun frigate commanded by the Raïs Ahmad Zmirli, a brig of 20 guns, commanded by Raïs Mustapha, a Maltese renegade. The dey authorized him to cross in the Atlantic Ocean which Raïs Hamidou did under the cover of night . The Algerian squadron captured three Portuguese ships. The Portuguese signed a peace treaty with the Algerians in 1810, paying heavy compensation.

In 1811, a war broke out between the Deylik of Algiers and The Beylik of Tunis. On 10 October 1811, Hamidou captured an English ship containing Tunisian goods. On May 22, with a fleet of six warships, and four gunboats, he captured a Tunisian frigate which he brought back to Algiers after a tough fight against a fleet of twelve Tunisian warships in the Action of 22 May 1811.

Following this naval battle, Hamidou received an ovation after the Dey complimented him in open court. Hamidou recorded a number of other successes between 1812 and 1815. He took part in attacks against ships from Greece, Sicily, Sweden, Holland, Denmark, and Spain. According to some sources, during his career, he seized a total of more than 200 sailboats.

Death 
He died in 1815 after being ambushed by an American fleet during the US-Algerian war.

References

Sources
John de Courcy Ireland (1974), "Raïs Hamidou: The Last of the Great Algerian Corsairs", The Mariner’s Mirror, 60(2), 187–196.
 
 Paul Desprès, Raïs Hamidou : Le dernier corsaire barbaresque d'Alger, Harmattan, mars 2007
 H. D. de Grammont, Histoire d'Alger sous la domination turque, Paris 1887

1773 births
1815 deaths
Privateers

Algerian sailors
19th-century Algerian people
Barbary Wars
Barbary pirates
19th-century pirates
18th-century Algerian people